Engsh is a cant that originated in Nairobi, Kenya in the 1980s. While Sheng developed in the poorer parts of Nairobi, Engsh evolved among the youth of the richer, more affluent neighbourhoods. Engsh is English based, but mixes Swahili, and other ethnic languages such as Kikuyu and Luo. However, just like Sheng, it is a code, and therefore cannot be understood, for the most part, by standard English speakers. Both Engsh and Sheng originated as  secret codes against adults, to enable Nairobi youth to communicate with each other in a language the adults could not understand. The original speakers have since become adults, and parents. Both Engsh and Sheng evolve very fast, and the ability to keep up with the "in" words of the moment becomes harder the older a person gets, therefore they are still considered languages of the youth.

In the past, there was no distinction made between Sheng and Engsh, but the youth speakers of both languages noticed their inability to understand each other properly, as the languages had evolved differently primarily due to the different economic backgrounds. Nevertheless, there are still many similarities between Sheng and Engsh, but Engsh is unique enough to stand as a cant of its own.

See also
 Kenyan English

References

External links
Article in the International Journal of the Sociology of Language, Volume 125, Issue 1 (Jan 1997).
Prezi presentation, 'Is It Sheng or Engsh? The ignored variety is alive and clicking'. Radboud University, October 2013.

Swahili-based pidgins and creoles
Languages of Kenya
Cant languages
English-based argots

Macaronic forms of English
Languages attested from the 1980s
African Urban Youth Languages